Giving Gifts is a work of public art by Evelyn Patricia Terry located in the parking structure at General Mitchell International Airport on the south side of Milwaukee, Wisconsin.  The artwork, a lattice of painted metal, was commissioned by the Milwaukee County Percent for Art Program.

References

Public art in the United States
Metal sculptures
Outdoor sculptures in Milwaukee
2002 establishments in Wisconsin
2002 sculptures